Sylvia Laughter ( – October 15, 2022) was an American politician who was a member of the Arizona House of Representatives from January 1999 until January 2005. She was the first Navajo woman to serve in the Arizona legislature, as well as the first and only politically independent legislator to serve in the state legislature since Arizona's statehood in 1912.

Biography
Laughter was first elected to the House in November 1998 as a Democrat, representing District 3. She was re-elected in 2000, and again after redistricting in 2002, representing District 2. In February 2003, she changed her party affiliation from Democrat to Independent. She ran for re-election in the November 2004 election but was defeated by Democrats Ann Kirkpatrick and Albert Tom. Between 2004 and 2010 she changed her party affiliation back to Democrat, and ran for the Arizona State Senate in 2010 in District 2. She lost in the primary to Jack Jackson, Jr.

She died from complications of COVID-19 in Mesa, Arizona, on October 15, 2022, at the age of 63.

References

1950s births
Year of birth missing
2022 deaths
Navajo people
Members of the Arizona House of Representatives
Arizona Democrats
Arizona Independents
20th-century American politicians
20th-century American women politicians
21st-century American politicians
21st-century American women politicians
Women state legislators in Arizona
People from Navajo County, Arizona
21st-century Native Americans
21st-century Native American women
Native American people from Arizona
Brigham Young University alumni
Deaths from the COVID-19 pandemic in Arizona